Paduka Sri Sultan Mansur Shah II ibni Almarhum Raja Kecil Lasa Raja Inu (died 1627) was the seventh Sultan of Perak. He was the brother of the fifth Sultan of Perak, Sultan Alauddin Shah, and grandson of the late Sultan Ahmad Tajuddin Shah.

Reign 
After Sultan Mukaddam Shah (6th Sultan of Perak) died in the year 1619 in the Aceh Sultanate, one of the orang-orang besar of Perak who had the title of Maharaja Lela went to Johor. At that time Perak was still under the control of Aceh. So all decisions related to Perak must get approval from the Sultan of Aceh. Even so, Maharaja Lela ignored the Sultan of Aceh and proceeded to Johor to obtain a descendent of the Sultan of Perak in order to appoint the new Sultan of Perak. Maharaja Lela had brought Raja Mansur back to Perak, after being brought back to Perak, Raja Mansur was installed as the 7th Sultan of Perak with the title of Sultan Mansur Shah II. Sultan Mansur Shah II resided in Semat. According to Sejarah Raja Perak, when Sultan Mansur Shah II ruled Perak, it is said that he always went back and forth to Johor because he had another wife there. In 1627 after ruling Perak for 8 years, he died while in the Johor Sultanate and was buried there. However, there is a discrepancy in the information available regarding this when compared to the known history of Perak.

According to the known history of Perak, in the year 1627, Sultan Iskandar Muda of Aceh sent an army to Perak. The army was to remove Sultan Mansur Shah II from the throne of Perak. This is because Perak was still under the power of Aceh at that time. In addition, Sultan Mansur Shah II ascended the throne of Perak without the consent of the government of Aceh. Raja Bongsu or Raja Yusuf (Sultan Mahmud Shah I) who is the younger brother of the late Sultan Mukaddam Shah was appointed by the nobles of Aceh to replace Sultan Mansur Shah II.

Burial 
Sultan Mansur Shah II was then taken to Aceh and is said to have died there. To this day, there is still no specific explanation regarding which history is more accurate. In the official pamphlet during the coronation of Sultan Yusuf Izzuddin Shah in 1949, it is written that Sultan Mansur Shah II was taken to Aceh and died there.

Even so, in the official pamphlet during the coronation of Sultan Idris II Iskandar Al-Mutawakkil Alallahi Shah (33rd Sultan of Perak), it was mentioned that Sultan Mansur Shah II had died in Johor and was called Marhum Mangkat in Johor. Until today, the tomb of Sultan Mansur Shah II still cannot be found in Johor or in Aceh. However, many believe in the version of the story that Sultan Mansur Shah II died in Aceh.

References 

Sultans of Perak
1627 deaths
Royal House of Perak
Malay people
People of Malay descent
Muslim monarchs
Sultans
Sunni monarchs
People from Perak